Legislative elections were held in France was held on 17 and 24 November 1827. The Ultra-royalists loyal to Charles X of France lost the elections.

Electoral system
Only citizens paying taxes were eligible to vote.

Results

Aftermath
Charles X of France dissolved the elected Assembly in 1830 and called the 1830 election.

References

Legislative elections in France
France
Legislative
France